Tanner Lee Houck (born June 29, 1996) is an American professional baseball pitcher for the Boston Red Sox of Major League Baseball (MLB). He was drafted by the Red Sox with the 24th overall pick in the 2017 MLB draft.

Amateur career
Houck attended Collinsville High School in Collinsville, Illinois. He was drafted by the Toronto Blue Jays in the 12th round of the 2014 MLB draft, but did not sign and attended the University of Missouri to play college baseball. As a freshman at Missouri in 2015, Houck started 15 games, going 8–5 with a 3.49 earned run average (ERA) and 91 strikeouts and only 12 walks in  innings. As a sophomore, Houck started 15 games and was 5–6 with a 2.99 ERA and 106 strikeouts.

Professional career
The Boston Red Sox selected Houck with the 24th overall pick in the 2017 MLB draft. He signed on June 21, 2017, and was assigned to the Class A Short Season Lowell Spinners, where he spent the whole season, posting an 0–3 record with a 3.63 ERA in  innings pitched. In 2018, he played with the Class A-Advanced Salem Red Sox where he pitched to a 7–11 record with a 4.24 ERA in 23 starts.

In 2019, he began with the Double-A Portland Sea Dogs, and was promoted to the Triple-A Pawtucket Red Sox on July 13. Overall during 2019, Houck was 8–6 with a 4.01 ERA and 107 strikeouts in  innings. Following the 2019 regular season, Houck made six starts for the Peoria Javelinas of the Arizona Fall League.

During the start-delayed 2020 MLB season, Houck won his MLB debut against the Miami Marlins on September 15, allowing two hits and no runs in five innings pitched while striking out seven batters.  Those strikeouts resulted in Houck donating $700 to his charity, Pitch for Adoption, as before the game he had pledged to donate $100 for each strikeout. While Houck was a freshman in high school, his family adopted a 4-year-old girl, which moved him to become a supporter for adoption. Houck became only the fourth player in Red Sox history to strikeout seven or more batters and not allow any runs in an MLB debut game. In Houck's second start, against the New York Yankees on September 20, he took a no hitter into the sixth inning, exiting the game after that inning having held the Yankees to one hit and one unearned run. Overall with the 2020 Red Sox, Houck appeared in three games (all starts), compiling a 3–0 record with 0.53 ERA and 21 strikeouts in 17 innings pitched. Following the 2020 season, Houck was ranked by Baseball America as the Red Sox' number eight prospect.

Houck began the 2021 season on Boston's active roster; he lost one start and made one relief appearance before being optioned to the team's alternate training site on April 7. He was recalled to start one game of a doubleheader against the Chicago White Sox on April 18, taking the loss. Houck was again recalled by the Red Sox on July 16, earning his first major-league save that evening, pitching the final three innings of a 4–0 win over the Yankees in The Bronx. He was optioned to and recalled from the Triple-A Worcester Red Sox several times during July and August. Overall during the regular season, Houck made 18 appearances (13 starts) for Boston, compiling a 1–5 record with 3.52 ERA; he struck out 87 batters in 69 innings.

Houck began the 2022 season in the Red Sox' starting rotation. He was placed on the restricted list prior to a late April series in Toronto, as he was apparently not vaccinated against COVID-19 (required to enter Canada), causing him to miss a start. He re-joined the team on April 29 in Baltimore. Houck was again placed on the restricted list in late June when the Red Sox played another series to Toronto. On August 9, Houck was placed on the injured list due to lower-back inflammation. On September 3, Red Sox manager Alex Cora announced that Houck would have season-ending back surgery. In 32 appearances (four starts) during 2022, Houck recorded a 5–4 record with eight saves and a 3.15 ERA while striking out 56 batters in 60 innings pitched.

International career
In the summer of 2015, Houck played for the United States collegiate national team. Against Cuba, Houck, A. J. Puk and Ryan Hendrix combined to throw a no-hitter.

In October 2019, Houck was selected for the United States national baseball team for the 2019 WBSC Premier12 tournament.

References

External links

SoxProspects.com
Missouri Tigers bio

1996 births
Living people
Baseball players from Illinois
Boston Red Sox players
Lowell Spinners players
Major League Baseball pitchers
Missouri Tigers baseball players
Pawtucket Red Sox players
People from Collinsville, Illinois
Peoria Javelinas players
Portland Sea Dogs players
Salem Red Sox players
Worcester Red Sox players
United States national baseball team players
2019 WBSC Premier12 players